Belgium chose their Junior Eurovision entry for 2007 through Junior Eurosong, a national final consisting of 9 songs competing over three stages. The winner of Junior Eurosong was Trust, with the song "Anders".

Before Eurovision

Junior Eurosong 2007 
Junior Eurosong was the national final for Belgium at the Junior Eurovision Song Contest 2007, organised by Belgian broadcaster Vlaamse Radio- en Televisieomroep (VRT).

Format 
The format of the competition consisted of three shows: one quarter-final, one semi-final and a final. All shows were hosted by Ben Roelants.

Results during the quarter-final and the semi-final shows were determined by the three-member jury panel and votes from the public. In the quarter-final, the songs first faced a public televote where the top five entries qualified. The jury then selected an additional qualifier from the remaining entries to proceed in the competition. In the semi-final, the songs first faced a public televote where the top three entries qualified. The jury then selected an additional qualifier from the remaining entries to proceed in the competition. In the final, public televoting exclusively determined the winner.

The jury participated in each show by providing feedback to the competing artists and selecting entries to advance in the competition. The panel consists of:

Karen Damen
 Stijn Kolacny
 Heidi Lenaerts

Quarter-final 

The quarter-final took place on 8 September 2007. Six entries qualified to the final. The nine competing entries first faced a public televote where the top five songs advanced. An additional qualifier was selected from the remaining four entries by the jury.

Semi-final 
The semi-final took place on 15 September 2007. Four entries qualified to the final. The six competing entries first faced a public televote where the top three songs advanced. An additional qualifier was selected from the remaining three entries by the jury.

Final
The final took place on 22 September 2007. "Anders" performed by Trust was selected as the winner after accumulating the highest number of televotes.

At Eurovision 
At Junior Eurovision, Belgium performed in second position, before Armenia and after Georgia. Belgium placed in 15th position with 19 points; the highest of which was 7 points, which came from the Netherlands, and was the only country that awarded points to Belgium.

Voting

Notes

References

External links 
 Official Belgian JESC Site

Junior Eurovision Song Contest
2007
Belgium